Antrodiella citrea is a bracket fungus native to Australia, and New Zealand.

It was originally described as Polyporus citreus by English botanist Miles Joseph Berkeley in 1872, and has undergone several name changes before being placed in the genus Antrodiella by Leif Ryvarden in 1984.

The pored spore-bearing surface is white, while the upper surface is bright yellow. The spore print is white, and the smooth oval spores are around 2.5 by 4.5 μm.

References

Fungi described in 1873
Fungi native to Australia
Fungi of New Zealand
Steccherinaceae
Taxa named by Miles Joseph Berkeley